Arne B. Mollén (2 May 1913 – 4 July 2000) was a Norwegian sports official.

Representing the club IF Vestheim, he was the president of the Norwegian Athletics Association from 1953 to 1955, vice chairman of the Norwegian Olympic Committee from 1965 to 1969 and chairman from 1969 to 1985. The Olympic Order was bestowed upon him in 1989.

References

1913 births
2000 deaths
Norwegian sports executives and administrators
Recipients of the Olympic Order